Johann Esaias Silberschlag (16 November 1721 – 22 November 1791) was a German Lutheran pastor (1753-1766) and natural scientist from Aschersleben, Principality of Halberstadt

In 1760, he became an external member of the Prussian Academy of Sciences in Berlin, Privy Councillor in the newly founded Office for Public Works, Section of Mechanical Engineering and Hydraulic Engineering. In 1780 Silberschlag observed and described the Brocken bow (also called Brocken spectre). In his book Geonetics or Explanation of the Mosaic Creation according to Physical and Mathematical Foundations (Geogonie oder Erklärung der mosaischen Erderschaffung nach physikalischen und mathematischen Grundlagen) he tried to reconcile theology and science. The lunar crater Silberschlag is named after him.

Sources
Silberschlag, Johann Esaias. 1788. Mein Lebenslauf zur Nachricht für meine Familie und Freunde. Berlin: Johann Karl Franz Eisfeld. 
Silberschlag, Hans. Wie der Name Silberschlag auf den Mond kam. Stadt und Geschichte. Zeitschrift für Erfurt, Nr. 11 (2/2001)
Tschackert, Paul, „Silberschlag, Johann Esaias“, in: Allgemeine Deutsche Biographie 34 (1892), S. 314-316 [Onlinefassung]; URL: http://www.deutsche-biographie.de/pnd115360166.html?anchor=adb

1721 births
1791 deaths
People from Aschersleben
18th-century German Lutheran clergy
Scientists from Saxony-Anhalt
Members of the Prussian Academy of Sciences
People from the Principality of Halberstadt
18th-century German scientists